(On the evening, however, of the same Sabbath), 42, is a church cantata by Johann Sebastian Bach. He composed it in Leipzig for the first Sunday after Easter and first performed it on 8 April 1725.

History and words 

Bach composed the cantata in Leipzig for the First Sunday after Easter, called Quasimodogeniti. He composed it in his second annual cycle, which consisted of chorale cantatas since the first Sunday after Trinity of 1724. Bach ended the sequence on Palm Sunday of 1725, this cantata is not a chorale cantata and the only cantata in the second cycle to begin with an extended sinfonia.

The prescribed readings for the Sunday were from the First Epistle of John, "our faith is the victory", and from the Gospel of John, the appearance of Jesus to the Disciples, first without then with Thomas, in Jerusalem. Werner Neumann suggested that Bach himself may have been the anonymous poet, while Charles Sanford Terry proposed Christian Weiss. Bach scholar Alfred Dürr supposed that it is the same author who wrote , first performed six days earlier on Easter Monday of 1725.

After the quote from the Gospel of John, the poet paraphrases, in movement 3, words of Jesus from the Gospel of Matthew, "" (For where two or three are gathered together in my name, there am I in the midst of them).

Bach first performed the cantata on 8 April 1725, and again in Leipzig at least twice, on 1 April 1731 and either on 1 April 1742 or on 7 April 1743.

Scoring and structure 

The cantata in seven movements is scored for soprano, alto, tenor, and bass soloists, a four-part choir only in the closing chorale, two oboes, bassoon, two violins, viola and basso continuo.

 S

Music 

Possibly Bach took the opening sinfonia from earlier music. According to John Eliot Gardiner, this movement and the first aria are both taken from Bach's lost congratulatory cantata , celebrating the 24th birthday of Leopold, Prince of Anhalt-Köthen on 10 December 1718. Alfred Dürr believed that it is a movement from a concerto. It does not highlight a particular solo instrument (although Julian Mincham sees a close resemblance to concerti which do, such as the opening movements of Violin Concerto in E major, BWV 1042, and the keyboard concerto, BWV 1053). Rather it is a type of concerto grosso (or "concerto a due cori", concerto for two choirs), the strings interacting with a concertino of the woodwinds, oboes and bassoon. The two groups first introduce their own lively themes, which are distinct but related to each other. Then they also exchange their themes and play together. The middle section begins with a surprising new motif for oboe and bassoon, which Bach himself marked "cantabile".

The Bible quote is sung in recitative by the tenor as the Evangelist, accompanied by the continuo in repeated fast notes, possibly illustrating the anxious heart beat of the disciples, when Jesus appears, "On the evening, however, of the same Sabbath, when the disciples had gathered and the door was locked out of fear of the Jews, Jesus came and walked among them".

In movement 3, an aria marked adagio, the repetition is kept in the bassoon, but the strings hold long chords and the oboes play extended melodic lines. According to Dürr, it may have been another movement from the same concerto that movement 1 relies on.

Bach composed the chorale text of movement 4, "Do not despair, o little flock", as a duet, accompanied only by the continuo including bassoon. Fragments of the usual chorale theme, "", can be detected occasionally. Terry interprets that the bassoon obbligato was intended to accompany a chorale melody which "never actually sounded", conveying the "hiddenness" of the church in the world.

The bass prepares in a recitative, ending as an arioso, the last aria, which is accompanied by the divided violins and the continuo. The theme is again a contrast between the "" (restlessness of "the world") and "" (peace with Jesus). While the instruments play in wild motion, the bass sings a calm expressive melody, only accenting the word "" (persecution) by faster motion in long melismas. According to Mincham, this aria might go back to a different movement from the same concerto as the sinfonia.

Bach set it for four parts.

Recordings 
 Bach Made in Germany Vol. 1 – Cantatas IV, Günther Ramin, Thomanerchor, Gewandhausorchester, Marianne Basner, Gerda Schriever, Gert Lutze, Otto Siegl, Berlin Classics 1953
 Bach Aria Group – Cantatas & Cantata Movements, Robert Shaw, Bach Aria Group Orchestra, Robert Shaw Chorale & Orchestra, Eileen Farrell, Carol Smith, Jan Peerce, Norman Farrow, RCA Victor 1954
 J. S. Bach: Cantatas No. 42, No. 35, Hermann Scherchen, Wiener Akademie-Kammerchor, Vienna Radio Orchestra, Teresa Stich-Randall, Maureen Forrester, Alexander Young, John Boyden, Westminster/Baroque Music Club 1964
 J. S. Bach: Das Kantatenwerk – Sacred Cantatas Vol. 3, Nikolaus Harnoncourt, Wiener Sängerknaben, Chorus Viennensis, Concentus Musicus Wien, soloist of the Wiener Sängerknaben, Paul Esswood, Kurt Equiluz, Ruud van der Meer, Teldec 1974
 Die Bach Kantate Vol. 31, Helmuth Rilling, Gächinger Kantorei, Bach-Collegium Stuttgart, Arleen Augér, Julia Hamari, Peter Schreier, Philippe Huttenlocher, Hänssler 1981
 J. S. Bach: Ich hatte viel Bekümmernis, Philippe Herreweghe, Collegium Vocale Gent, La Chapelle Royale, Barbara Schlick, Gérard Lesne, Howard Crook, Peter Kooy, Harmonia Mundi France 1990
 Bach Edition Vol. 4 – Cantatas Vol. 1, Pieter Jan Leusink, Holland Boys Choir, Netherlands Bach Collegium, Ruth Holton, Sytse Buwalda, Knut Schoch, Bas Ramselaar, Brilliant Classics 1999
 Bach Cantatas Vol. 23: Arnstadt/Echternach, John Eliot Gardiner, Monteverdi Choir, English Baroque Soloists, Gillian Keith, Daniel Taylor, Charles Daniels, Stephen Varcoe, Soli Deo Gloria 2000
 J. S. Bach: Complete Cantatas Vol. 14, Ton Koopman, Amsterdam Baroque Orchestra & Choir, Deborah York, Bogna Bartosz, Jörg Dürmüller, Klaus Mertens, Antoine Marchand 2001
 J. S. Bach: Cantatas Vol. 36 (Cantatas from Leipzig 1725), Masaaki Suzuki, Bach Collegium Japan, Yukari Nonoshita, Robin Blaze, James Gilchrist, Dominik Wörner, BIS 2006

References

External links 
 Am Abend aber desselbigen Sabbats, BWV 42: performance by the Netherlands Bach Society (video and background information)
 
 Am Abend aber desselbigen Sabbats (concerto da chiesa) BWV 42; BC A 63 / Sacred cantata Bach Digital
 Cantata BWV 42 Am Abend aber desselbigen Sabbats: history, scoring, sources for text and music, translations to various languages, discography, discussion, Bach Cantatas website
 Luke Dahn: BWV 42.7 bach-chorales.com

Church cantatas by Johann Sebastian Bach
1725 compositions